The Greening of America is a 1970 book by Charles A. Reich.  It is a paean to the counterculture of the 1960s and its values.  Excerpts first appeared as an essay in the September 26, 1970 issue of The New Yorker.  The book was originally published by Random House.

Overview
The book's argument rests on three separate types of world view:

 "Consciousness I" applies to the typical values and opinions of rural farmers and small businesspeople which dominated society in 19th century America.
 "Consciousness II" represents a viewpoint of "an organizational society", featuring meritocracy and improvement through various large institutions, the ethos of the New Deal, World War II and the 1950s Silent Generation.
 "Consciousness III" represents the worldview of the 1960s counterculture, focusing on personal freedom, egalitarianism, and recreational drugs.

The book mixed sociological analysis with panegyrics to rock music, cannabis, and blue jeans, arguing that these fashions embodied a fundamental social shift.

Bestseller
The book was a best-seller in 1970 and 1971, and topped the New York Times Best Seller list on December 27, 1970 and other weeks.

References

  +–+Google Scholar
 The Greening of America turns 40: Q&A: Charles Reich, by Daniel Schwartz, CBC News, updated: Sept. 27, 2010

External links
book profile in Amazon.com

1970 non-fiction books
Random House books
Sociology books